The men's tournament of the volleyball at the 2022 South American Games was held from 4 to 8 October 2022 at the Paraguayan Volleyball Federation facilities in the SND complex cluster in Asunción, Paraguay. It was the sixth appearance of the volleyball men's tournament since the first edition in La Paz 1978 (it was not held from Santiago 1986 to Buenos Aires 2006).

Argentina were the five-time defending champions, having won all the previous editions of the tournament, but did not participate in this edition leaving its place vacant.

Chile won the gold medal and their first South American Games men's volleyball title after finishing in the first place of the single group with a match record of 4 wins and 0 loses and without conceding any set. Colombia and Peru got the silver and bronze medals respectively.

Schedule
The tournament was held over a 5-day period, from 4 to 8 October.

Teams
A total of six ODESUR NOCs entered teams for the men's tournament.

Rosters

Each participating NOC had to enter a roster of 12 players (Technical manual Article 9.3).

Competition format
The tournament consisted of a single group of 5 teams in which each team played once against the other 4 teams in the group on a single round-robin format (Technical manual Article 5). The top three teams were awarded gold, silver and bronze medals respectively.

Results

Standings
The pool ranking criteria was the following (Technical manual Articles 5.2 and 5.3):

 Number of matches won
 Match points
Match won 3–0 or 3–1: 3 points for the winner, 0 points for the loser
Match won 3–2: 2 points for the winner, 1 point for the loser
 Sets ratio
 Points ratio
 Result of the match between the tied teams

Matches
All match times are in PYST (UTC−3).

Final ranking

Medalists

References

External links
 ASU2022 Volleyball Teams Male at ASU2022 official website.

Volleyball